The Lost Birds: An Extinction Elegy  is the fourth studio album by the American composer Christopher Tin. The music was performed by the Royal Philharmonic Orchestra with Voces8.

The album of twelve movements, ten of which use texts by poets Emily Dickinson, Sara Teasdale, Edna St. Vincent Millay, and Cristina Rossetti, along with two purely instrumental tracks. Unlike Tin's previous works, all movements of the piece are sung in English. The album is a musical memorial to bird species driven to extinction by humankind and a celebration of their beauty, while also presenting a warning about humanity’s own tenuous existence on the planet.

It was nominated for the 2023 Grammy Award for Best Classical Compendium.

Track listing

Charts
The Lost Birds débuted on Billboard Traditional Classical Albums chart at rank 2 for the week of October 15, 2022.

References

External links
 

2022 albums 
Royal Philharmonic Orchestra albums
Kickstarter-funded albums